Gyrtona is a genus of moths of the family Euteliidae first described by Francis Walker in 1863.

Description
Similar to Stictoptera, differs in porrect palpi and more hairy. A large frontal tuft present. Antennae with long cilia in male and abdomen tuftless. Forewings with slightly raised tufts at middle and end of cell.

Species
 Gyrtona albicans (Pagenstecher 1900)
 Gyrtona erebenna (Mabille, 1900)
 Gyrtona eusema (Prout, 1926)
 Gyrtona ferrimissalis Walker, 1863
 Gyrtona inclusalis Walker, 1863
 Gyrtona hylusalis Walker, 1863
 Gyrtona lapidarioides Holloway, ??
 Gyrtona malgassica Kenrick, 1917
 Gyrtona niveivitta Swinhoe, 1905
 Gyrtona obliqualis Holloway, ??
 Gyrtona oxyptera Hampson, 1912
 Gyrtona perlignealis (Walker, 1863)
 Gyrtona polionota Hampson, 1905
 Gyrtona polymorpha Hampson, 1905
 Gyrtona proximalis Walker, 1863
 Gyrtona pseudoquadratifera Holloway, ??
 Gyrtona purpurea Robinson, 1975
 Gyrtona pyraloides (Walker, 1864)
 Gyrtona semicarbonalis Walker, 1863

References

The Moths of Borneo

External links
 

Stictopterinae
Moth genera